Irvin Martin Smith (born October 13, 1971) is a former American football player who was selected by the New Orleans Saints in the 1st round (20th overall) of the 1993 NFL Draft.

A ,  tight end, he went on to star at the University of Notre Dame. Smith played in the NFL from 1993 to 1999.

Smith co-hosts "EZ Sports Talk" with his older brother, former Atlanta Falcons tight end Ed "EZ" Smith, in Phoenix, Arizona. His son Irv Smith Jr. played college football as a tight end at the University of Alabama and is a member of the NFL's Minnesota Vikings.

NFL career statistics

References

External links
 Database Football Stats

1971 births
Living people
American football tight ends
Notre Dame Fighting Irish football players
New Orleans Saints players
People from Pemberton Township, New Jersey
San Francisco 49ers players
Cleveland Browns players
Players of American football from New Jersey